Nevermen is an American musical supergroup. It consists of Tunde Adebimpe, Mike Patton, and Adam "Doseone" Drucker. It was listed by Paste as one of the "20 Best New Bands of 2015".

History
Nevermen was formed in 2008, when Adam "Doseone" Drucker jammed with Tunde Adebimpe in a Brooklyn warehouse. Later, the two sent some of the music to Mike Patton. The trio refined the recordings with one another over the years.

On August 5, 2015, Nevermen released their debut track, "Tough Towns". It was, according to Doseone, "dedicated to anyone remotely young, feeling inexplicably inspired in the 'nowhere' they are from." On December 4, 2015, the group released another track, "Mr Mistake". Boards of Canada released a remix of the song on January 12, 2016. On January 22, 2016, the group released the third track, "Hate On".

On January 29, 2016, Nevermen released their debut album, Nevermen. It debuted at number 9 on Billboards Heatseekers Albums chart. At Metacritic, it received an average score of 69 out of 100, based on 19 reviews, indicating "generally favorable reviews".

Discography

Albums
 Nevermen (2016)

Singles
 "Tough Towns" (2015)
 "Mr Mistake" (2015)
 "Hate On" (2016)
 “Treat Em Right (Boards of Canada Remix)” (2021)

References

Further reading

External links
 
 

American musical groups
American musical trios
Ipecac Recordings artists
Lex Records artists